STLA can refer to:

 the Socialist Trade and Labor Alliance, a non-extant socialist labor union in the United States
 Stellantis, a multinational automotive manufacturing corporation
 the STLA electric vehicle platforms created by Stellantis